Henry Ludwell Moore (November 21, 1869 – April 28, 1958) was an American economist known for his pioneering work in econometrics. Paul Samuelson named Moore (along with Harry Gunnison Brown, Allyn Abbott Young, Wesley Clair Mitchell, Frank Knight, Jacob Viner, and Henry Schultz) as one of the several "American saints in economics" born after 1860.

Biography
Moore was born in Charles County, Maryland, the first of 15 children. He received a B.A. from Randolph-Macon College in 1892 and a Ph.D. from Johns Hopkins University in 1896. His thesis was on von Thünen's theory of the natural wage. The visiting lecturers included Simon Newcomb and J. B. Clark and he may have learned some mathematical economics from them. While doing the Ph.D., he spent a year at the University of Vienna. At that time study in Europe was quite usual; Americans often went to Europe, usually to Germany, for their entire graduate education. Moore was an early U.S. Ph.D. His academic career proceeded through an instructorship and lectureship at Johns Hopkins, a professorship at Smith College from 1897 to 1902 and finally to positions at Columbia University. He retired from Columbia in 1929 due to ill health.

Moore's earliest interest seems to have been in the history of economic thought but in 1901 he turned to the project of providing a "statistical complement to pure economics." Although he had studied with Carl Menger in Vienna, his "pure economics" belonged rather to the Marshallian and Walrasian branches of marginal economics. In 1903, 1909 and 1912, Moore visited Walras, Pareto and Bortkiewicz respectively. To improve his knowledge of statistical techniques, he attended the lectures of Karl Pearson in 1909 and 1913. In 1917 he was elected as a Fellow of the American Statistical Association.

Moore's first book, on testing the marginal productivity theory of wages, was well received as a pioneering venture, although Alfred Marshall refused to read it, telling Moore that "it proceeds on lines which I deliberately decided not to follow many years ago." Moore wrote two books on economic cycles, in which the economic cycle is presented as a reflection of a physical cycle. Economic Cycles argues that a rainfall cycle affects agricultural markets, which affect industrial markets. Generating Economic Cycles traces the rainfall cycle back to an astronomical cycle. There is a strong family resemblance between this cycle work and the earlier sunspot research of William Stanley Jevons. Moore's last book Synthetic Economics aimed to provide a statistical counterpart to Walras's general equilibrium theory.

With his contemporaries, Wesley Mitchell and Irving Fisher, H. L. Moore pioneered new kinds of quantitative economics in the United States. Unlike them, Moore was not a great public figure. He was a private, sensitive person who suffered from long periods of illness. At the end of his essay on Moore, Stigler writes "In general one can say that Moore was as much a founder of this movement [statistical economics] as any one man is likely to be a founder of a great movement toward which a science has been steadily moving."

Works 
 Laws of Wages: An Essay in Statistical Economics, 1911.
 Economic Cycles: Their Law and Cause, 1914.
 Forecasting the Yield and Price of Cotton, 1917.
 Generating Economic Cycles, 1923.
 Synthetic Economics, 1929
There is a full bibliography in Stigler's article below.

Notes

References

External links 
 New School: Henry Ludwell Moore
 Two of Moore's books are available at the Archive for the History of Economic Thought
 Laws of Wages
 Economic Cycles
 Columbia University Library: Henry Ludwell Moore Collection

1869 births
1958 deaths
People from Charles County, Maryland
Randolph–Macon College alumni
Johns Hopkins University alumni
Columbia University faculty
Smith College faculty
Fellows of the American Statistical Association
Fellows of the Econometric Society
Economists from Maryland